The Hen and Chickens Theatre is a fringe venue for theatre and comedy situated above a pub at  Highbury in the London Borough of Islington. The theatre management was awarded to actress Felicity Wren in 1999.

References

External links
Hen And Chickens Website

Theatres in the London Borough of Islington
Pub theatres in London
Highbury